Juan Carlos Sánchez (born March 1, 1985) is a Bolivian former footballer who played as a defender in the Liga de Futbol Profesional Boliviano.

External links
 Juan Carlos Sánchez Ampuero at playmakerstats.com (English version of ceroacero.es)
 

1985 births
Living people
Sportspeople from Cochabamba
Association football defenders
Bolivian footballers
Club Aurora players
The Strongest players
Club Blooming players
Club Real Potosí players
Universitario de Sucre footballers